William Sherwood (d. at Dublin, 3 December 1482) was an English ecclesiastic. He was Bishop of Meath, and later Chancellor of Ireland.

Life
He obtained the see by papal provision in April 1460. Of his earlier life, nothing is known.

He soon came into conflict with Thomas FitzGerald, 7th Earl of Desmond, who was deputy to George, Duke of Clarence, Lord-Lieutenant of Ireland. The earl accused the bishop of instigating the murder of some of his followers, and in 1464 both went to England to lay their grievances before the king. Edward IV of England upheld the earl, who was supported by the Irish parliament, and acquitted him of all charges of disloyalty and treasonable relations with the Irish people. But when in 1467 he was disgraced, and succeeded by John Tiptoft, 1st Earl of Worcester. Bishop Sherwood was suspected of leading the opposition, which finally brought the earl to the scaffold.

Some years after his rival's death, Sherwood himself was appointed Lord Deputy, but his own rule was so unpopular that in 1477 he was removed from office, having governed for only two years. He was Lord Chancellor of Ireland from 1475 to 1481, when he was replaced by Walter Champfleur, Abbot of St Mary's Abbey, Dublin.

He lies buried at Newtown Abbey near Trim.

References
Annals of the Four Masters (Dublin, 1848–51);
John Thomas Gilbert, Viceroys of Ireland (Dublin, 1865);

The Register of St. Thomas Abbey, Dublin (R.S. London, 1889) gives the text of an agreement between Sherwood and the abbey.

External links
Catholic Encyclopedia article

1482 deaths
15th-century English Roman Catholic bishops
Roman Catholic bishops of Meath
Year of birth unknown